Iwao Taki (Japanese name: 瀧巖, 瀧巌, 滝巌, Hiragana: たき いわお, 19 June 1901 - 31 May 1984) was a Japanese malacologist. He described many taxa of Mollusca with Isao Taki (his brother), Tadashige Habe and Tokubei Kuroda.

Life 

Iwao Taki was born on 19 June 1901 in Matsuyama City, Ehime Prefecture. On the suggestion of his brother, Isao Taki, he entered  in 1920. The next year, he entered Department of zoology, Faculty of Science, Kyoto Imperial University. In 1928, he graduated and worked in Seto Marine Biological Laboratory. He returned to Kyoto in August, and he founded The Malacological Society of Japan (Japanese: 日本貝類学会), and was involved in publishing the journal "Venus". In 1929, he became an assistant of department of zoology, Kyoto Imperial University. In 1950, he was appointed to a professorship of the Faculty of Fisheries and Animal Husbandry, Hiroshima University and became a head of marine biological laboratory. He was rarely involved in the graduate research of students because of his position, but he taught Yoichi Kado (1917 - 1985) after the end of World War II. In 1952, he was promoted to professor of the Faculty of Fisheries and Animal Husbandry, Hiroshima University and he doubled as professor of the Faculty of Science, Hiroshima University and the head of marine biological laboratory until the next year.

In 1953, he named one of the meritorious men of The Malacological Society of Japan. From 1961 to 1965, he worked as the branch manager of the Faculty of Fisheries and Animal Husbandry annex, Hiroshima University Library. After retirement, he became professor emeritus of Hiroshima University.  In addition, he served as the president of The Malacological Society of Japan from 1963 to 1978. After his term, he became honorary president of The Malacological Society of Japan. In 1966 when he retired from Hiroshima University, he became a professor at Kansai Gaidai College for one year. Subsequently, he worked as professor of Kansai Gaidai University from 1967 to 1968. After that, he was a professor of Kyoto Sangyo University from 1967 to 1978, Kyoto Sangyo University guest professor from 1978 to 1979 and Kyoto Sangyo University part-time lecturer from 1979 to 1981.

In 1971, he was awarded the Order of the Rising Sun, 3rd class.

Bibliography 
This is the list of his work based on the Malacological Society of Japan (1984) "List of Malacological Publications by Dr. Iwao Taki".

Journal articles

Books

Molluscan species described by him 
The species lists is based on The Malacological Society of Japan (1984)"Molluscan Taxa Described by Dr. Iwao Taki".

Polyplacophora 
The list of chitons named by Iwao Taki.
 Acanthochiton dissimilis Isao Taki & Iwao Taki, 1931
 Chiton kurodai Isao Taki & Iwao Taki, 1929
 Chiton komainus Isao Taki & Iwao Taki, 1929
 Cryptoplax propior Isao Taki & Iwao Taki, 1930
 Ischnochiton (Lepidozona) iyoensis Isao Taki & Iwao Taki, 1929
 Ischnochiton comptus Gould, 1859 form isaoi Iwao Taki, 1964
 Ischnochiton (Stenoplax) uenustus Isao Taki & Iwao Taki, 1931
 Lepidopleurus hirasei Isao Taki & Iwao Taki, 1929
 Notoplax (Ikedaella) conicus Isao Taki & Iwao Taki, 1929
 Notoplax (Notoplax) dalli Isao Taki & Iwao Taki, 1929

Cephalopoda 
The list of octopuses and squids named by Iwao Taki.
 Benthoctopus fuscus Iwao Taki, 1964
 Benthoctopus violescens Iwao Taki, 1964
 Callistoctopus arakawai Iwao Taki, 1964
 Callistoctopus meganocellatus Iwao Taki, 1964
 Calliteuthis inermis Iwao Taki, 1964
 Enoploteuthis therarage Iwao Taki, 1964
 Idioctopus gracilipes Iwao Taki, 1962
 Megaleledone senoi Iwao Taki, 1961
 Octopus marginatus Iwao Taki, 1964
 Octopus (Octopus) mutilans Iwao Taki, 1942
 Octopus (Octopus) sasakii Iwao Taki, 1942 [for Octopus globosus Sasaki, 1929]
 Onykia japonica Iwao Taki, 1964
 Ophisthoteuthis japonica Iwao Taki, 1962
 Pareledone umitakae Iwao Taki, 1961
 Paroctopus araneoides Iwao Taki, 1964
 Paroctopus megalops Iwao Taki, 1964
 Sasakinella eurycephala Iwao Taki, 1964

Gastropoda 
The list of gastropods named by Iwao Taki.
 Lamellaria utinomii Iwao Taki, 1972
 Mesophaedusa moriyai Kuroda & Iwao Taki, 1944
 Oncidella kurodai Isao Taki & Iwao Taki, 1935
 Oncidella orientalis Isao Taki & Iwao Taki, 1935
 Polynices (mammilla) kurodai Iwao Taki, 1942 [for Natica macrostoma Philippi, 1852]
 Stereophaedusa costifera Kuroda & Iwao Taki, 1944
 Tyrannophaedusa kawamotoi Kuroda & Iwao Taki, 1944

Bivalvia 
The list of bivalves named by Iwao Taki.
 Bankia (Bankia) komaii Iwao Taki & Habe, 1945
 Kuphus (Coeloteredo) teredoides Iwao Taki & Habe, 1945
 Kuphus (Idioteredo) kiiensis Iwao Taki & Habe, 1945
 Mesopholus intusgranosa Iwao Taki & Habe, 1945
 Mesopholus nucicola Iwao Taki & Habe, 1945
 Psiloteredo (Phylloteredo) amboinensis Iwao Taki & Habe, 1945
 Psiloteredo (Phylloteredo) kirai Iwao Taki & Habe, 1945
 Psiloteredo (Psiloteredo) pentagonalis Iwao Taki & Habe, 1945
 Scintilia violescens Kuroda & Iwao Taki, 1962
 Teredo (Lyrodus) taiwanensis Iwao Taki & Habe, 1945
 Xylophaga rikuzenica Iwao Taki & Habe, 1945

Molluscan taxa described by him 
The lists of taxa below are based on The Malacological Society of Japan (1984)"Molluscan Taxa Dedicated to Dr. Iwao Taki".

Genus group taxa 
 genus Callistoctopus Iwao Taki, 1964
 genus Idioctopus Iwao Taki, 1962
 subgenus Idioteredo Iwao Taki & Habe, 1945
 subgenus Ikedaella Isao Taki & Iwao Taki, 1929
 genus Megaleledone Iwao Taki, 1961
 genus Mesopholus Iwao Taki & Habe, 1945
 genus Protoxylophaga Iwao Taki & Habe, 1945
 genus Sasakinella Iwao Taki, 1964

Family group taxa 
 family Idioctopodidae Iwao Taki, 1962
 subfamily Megaleledoniae Iwao Taki, 1961

Phylum group taxa 
 subphylum Lecithophora Iwao Taki, 1961
 subphylum Larvacea Iwao Taki, 1961

Molluscan taxa dedicated to him 
Almost all taxa were named using his fullname because of the existence of Taki Isao, a malacologist who studies Chiton and his elder brother.
 Adipicola iwaotakii (Habe, 1958) [syn. Adula iwaotakii Habe, 1958]
 Amaea iwaotakii Azuma, 1961
 Dimya radiata takii Kuroda, 1932
 Divarilima iwaotakii (Habe, 1961) [syn. Acesta iwaotakii Habe, 1961]
 Ferreiraella takii (Wu & Okutani, 1984) 
 Galeomma takii Kuroda, 1928
 Hemiphaedusa hemileuca takii Kuroda, 1936
 Iwaoa reticulata Kuroda, 1953
 Monophorus iwaotakii (Kosuge, 1963) [syn. Notosinister iwaotakii Kosuge, 1963]
 Nipponaphera iwaotakii Habe, 1961
 Salinator takii Kuroda, 1928
 Tristichotrochus iwaotakii Azuma, 1961

References

Further reading 
 
 
 
 
 
 
 

1901 births
1984 deaths
People from Matsuyama, Ehime
Kyoto University alumni
Japanese malacologists
Japanese taxonomists
20th-century Japanese zoologists